Akhror Bozorov is a male Uzbekistani Paralympic powerlifter.

He represented Uzbekistan at the 2016 Summer Paralympics in Rio de Janeiro, Brazil and he won the bronze medal in the men's 80 kg event.

References

External links 
 

Living people
Year of birth missing (living people)
Place of birth missing (living people)
Uzbekistani powerlifters
Powerlifters at the 2016 Summer Paralympics
Medalists at the 2016 Summer Paralympics
Paralympic bronze medalists for Uzbekistan
Male powerlifters
Paralympic medalists in powerlifting
21st-century Uzbekistani people